The economics of climate change mitigation is the part of the economics of climate change related to climate change mitigation, that is actions that are designed to limit the amount of long-term climate change. Mitigation may be achieved through the reduction of  greenhouse gas (GHG) emissions and the enhancement of sinks that absorb GHGs, for example forests.

Public good issues
The atmosphere is an international public good and GHG emissions are an international externality. A change in the quality of the atmosphere does not affect the welfare of all individuals and countries equally.

Heterogeneity

GHG emissions are unevenly distributed around the world, as are the potential impacts of climate change. Nations with higher than average emissions that face potentially small negative/positive climate change impacts have little incentive to reduce their emissions. Nations with relatively low levels of emissions that face potentially large negative climate change impacts have a large incentive to reduce emissions. Nations that avoid mitigation can benefit from free-riding on the actions of others, and may even enjoy gains in trade and/or investment. The unequal distribution of benefits from mitigation, and the potential advantages of free-riding, made it difficult to secure the Paris Agreement, which aims to reduce emissions.

Intergenerational transfers

Mitigation of climate change can be considered a transfer of wealth from the present generation to future generations. The amount of mitigation determines the composition of resources (e.g., environmental or material) that future generations receive. Across generations, the costs and benefits of mitigation are not equally shared: future generations potentially benefit from mitigation, while the present generation bear the costs of mitigation but do not directly benefit (ignoring possible co-benefits, such as reduced air pollution). If the current generation also benefitted from mitigation, it might lead them to be more willing to bear the costs of mitigation.

Policies and approaches to reduce emissions

Price signals

Carbon pricing 
A carbon price is a system of applying a price to carbon emissions, as a method of emissions mitigation. Potential methods of pricing include carbon emission trading, results-based climate finance, crediting mechanisms and more. Carbon pricing can also lend itself to the creation of carbon taxes, which would allow for governments to tax GHG emissions, as a method to benefit the government with a large increase in funding.

Carbon tax 
Carbon taxes are considered especially useful because, once a number has been created, it will benefit the government either with currency or with a lowering in GHG emissions or even both, and therefore benefit the environment. It is almost a worldwide consensus that carbon taxing is the most cost-effective method of having a substantial and rapid response to climate change and carbon emissions. However, backlash to the tax includes that it could be considered regressive, as the impact from the tax would be damaging disproportionately to the poor who spend much of their income on energy for their homes. Still, even with the near universal approval, there are many questions that are unanswered regarding both the collection and redistribution of the taxes. One of the central questions being how the newly collected taxes will be redistributed.

Some or all of the proceeds of a carbon tax can be used to stop it disadvantaging the poor.

Structural market reforms

Market-orientated reforms, as undertaken by several countries in the 1990s, can have important effects on energy use, energy efficiency, and therefore GHG emissions. In a literature assessment, Bashmakov et al. (2001:409) gave the example of China, which has made structural reforms with the aim of increasing GDP. They found that since 1978, energy use in China had increased by an average of 4% per year, but at the same time, energy use had been reduced per unit of GDP.

Emissions trading 
In addition to the implementation of command-and-control regulations (as with a carbon tax), governments can also use market-based approaches to mitigate emissions. One such method is emissions trading where governments set the total emissions of all polluters to a maximum and distribute permits, through auction or allocation, that allow entities to emit a portion, typically one ton of carbon dioxide equivalent (CO2e), of the mandated total emissions. In other words, the amount of pollution an entity can emit in an emissions trading system is limited by the number of permits they have. If a polluter wants to increase their emissions, they can only do so after buying permits from those who are willing to sell them. Many economists prefer this method of reducing emissions as it is market based and  highly cost effective. That being said, emissions trading alone is not perfect since it fails to place a clear price on emissions. Without this price, emissions prices are volatile due to the supply of permits being fixed, meaning their price is entirely determined by shifts in demand. This uncertainty in price is especially disliked by businesses since it prevents them from investing in abatement technologies with confidence which hinders efforts for mitigating emissions. Regardless, while emissions trading alone has its problems and cannot reduce pollutants to the point of stabilizing the global climate, it remains an important tool for addressing climate change.

Degrowth 
There is a debate about a potentially critical need for new ways of economic accounting, including directly monitoring and quantifying positive real-world environmental effects such as air quality improvements and related unprofitable work like forest protection, alongside far-reaching structural changes of lifestyles as well as acknowledging and moving beyond the limits of current economics such as GDP. Some argue that for effective climate change mitigation degrowth has to occur, while some argue that eco-economic decoupling could limit climate change enough while continuing high rates of traditional GDP growth. There is also research and debate about requirements of how economic systems could be transformed for sustainability – such as how their jobs could transition harmonously into green jobs – a just transition – and how relevant sectors of the economy – like the renewable energy industry and the bioeconomy – could be adequately supported.

While degrowth is often believed to be associated with decreased living standards and austerity measures, many of its proponents seek to expand universal public goods (such as public transport), increase health (fitness, wellbeing and freedom from diseases) and increase various forms of, often unconventional commons-oriented, labor. To this end, the application of both advanced technologies and reductions in various demands, including via overall reduced labor time or sufficiency-oriented strategies, are considered to be important by some.

Phasing out fossil fuel subsidies

Policies

National policies

International policies

Paris Agreement

Other policies

Regulatory instruments: This could involve the setting of regulatory standards for various products and processes for countries to adopt. The other option is to set national emission limits. The second option leads to inefficiency because the marginal costs of abatement differs between countries.
Initiatives such as the EU "cap and trade" system have also been implemented.
Carbon taxes: This would offer a potentially cost-effective means of reducing CO2 emissions. Compared with emissions trading, international or harmonized (where each country keeps the revenue it collects) taxes provide greater certainty about the likely costs of emission reductions. This is also true of a hybrid policy (see the article carbon tax).

Efficiency of international agreements

For the purposes of analysis, it is possible to separate efficiency from equity. It has been suggested that because of the low energy efficiency in many developing countries, efforts should first be made in those countries to reduce emissions. There are a number of policies to improve efficiency, including: 
Property rights reform. For example, deforestation could be reduced through reform of property rights.
Administrative reforms. For example, in many countries, electricity is priced at the cost of production. Economists, however, recommend that electricity, like any other good, should be priced at the competitive price.
Regulating non-greenhouse externalities. There are externalities other than the emission of GHGs, for example, road congestion leading to air pollution. Addressing these externalities, e.g., through congestion pricing and energy taxes, could help to lower both air pollution and GHG emissions.

General equilibrium theory

One of the aspects of efficiency for an international agreement on reducing emissions is participation. In order to be efficient, mechanisms to reduce emissions still require all emitters to face the same costs of emission. Partial participation significantly reduces the effectiveness of policies to reduce emissions. This is because of how the global economy is connected through trade.

General equilibrium theory points to a number of difficulties with partial participation. Examples are of "leakage" (carbon leakage) of emissions from countries with regulations on GHG emissions to countries with less regulation. For example, stringent regulation in developed countries could result in polluting industries such as aluminium production moving production to developing countries. Leakage is a type of "spillover" effect of mitigation policies.

Estimates of spillover effects are uncertain. If mitigation policies are only implemented in Kyoto Annex I countries, some researchers have concluded that spillover effects might render these policies ineffective, or possibly even cause global emissions to increase. Others have suggested that spillover might be beneficial and result in reduced emission intensities in developing countries.

Comprehensiveness

Efficiency also requires that the costs of emission reductions be minimized. This implies that all GHGs (CO2, methane, etc.) are considered as part of a policy to reduce emissions, and also that carbon sinks are included. Perhaps most controversially, the requirement for efficiency implies that all parts of the Kaya identity are included as part of a mitigation policy. The components of the Kaya identity are:
CO2 emissions per unit of energy, (carbon intensity)
energy per unit of output, (energy efficiency)
economic output per capita,
and human population.
Efficiency requires that the marginal costs of mitigation for each of these components is equal. In other words, from the perspective of improving the overall efficiency of a long-term mitigation strategy, population control has as much "validity" as efforts made to improve energy efficiency.

Equity in international agreements

Unlike efficiency, there is no consensus view of how to assess the fairness of a particular climate policy (Bashmakov et al., 2001:438–439; see also economics of global warming#Paying for an international public good). This does not prevent the study of how a particular policy impacts welfare. Edmonds et al. (1995) estimated that a policy of stabilizing national emissions without trading would, by 2020, shift more than 80% of the aggregate policy costs to non-OECD regions (Bashmakov et al., 2001:439). A common global carbon tax would result in an uneven burden of abatement costs across the world and would change with time. With a global tradable quota system, welfare impacts would vary according to quota allocation.

Finance

Article 4.2 of the United Nations Framework Convention on Climate Change commits industrialized countries to "[take] the lead" in reducing emissions. The Kyoto Protocol to the UNFCCC has provided only limited financial support to developing countries to assist them in climate change mitigation and adaptation. Additionally, private sector investment in mitigation and adaptation could be discouraged in the short and medium term because of the 2008 global financial crisis.

The International Energy Agency estimates that US$197 billion is required by states in the developing world above and beyond the underlying investments needed by various sectors regardless of climate considerations, this is twice the amount promised by the developed world at the UN Framework Convention on Climate Change (UNFCCC) Cancún Agreements. Thus, a new method is being developed to help ensure that funding is available for climate change mitigation. This involves financial leveraging, whereby public financing is used to encourage private investment.

The private sector is often unwilling to finance low carbon technologies in developing and emerging economies as the market incentives are often lacking. There are many perceived risks involved, in particular:
 General political risk associated politically instability, uncertain property rights and an unfamiliar legal framework.
 Currency risks are involved is financing is sought internationally and not provided in the nationally currency.
 Regulatory and policy risk – if the public incentives provided by a state may not be actually provided, or if provided, then not for the full length of the investment.
 Execution risk – reflecting concern that the local project developer/firm may lack the capacity and/or experience to execute the project efficiently.
 Technology risk as new technologies involved in low carbon technology may not work as well as expected.
 Unfamiliarity risks occur when investors have never undertaken such projects before.

Funds from the developed world can help mitigate these risks and thus leverage much larger private funds, the current aim to create $3 of private investment for every $1 of public funds. Public funds can be used to minimise the risks in the following way.
 Loan guarantees provided by international public financial institutions can be useful to reduce the risk to private lenders.
 Policy insurance can insurance the investor against changes or disruption to government policies designed to encourage low carbon technology, such as a feed-in tariff.
 Foreign exchange liquidity facilities can help reduce the risks associated with borrowing money in a different currency by creating a line of credit that can be drawn on when the project needs money as a result of local currency devaluation but then repaid when the project has a financial surplus.
 Pledge fund can help projects are too small for equity investors to consider or unable to access sufficient equity. In this model, public finance sponsors provide a small amount of equity to anchor and encourage much larger pledges from private investors, such as sovereign wealth funds, large private equity firms and pension funds. Private equity investors will tend to be risk-averse and focused primarily on long-term profitability, thus all projects would need to meet the fiduciary requirements of the investors.
 Subordinated equity fund – an alternative use of public finance is through the provision of subordinated equity, meaning that the repayment on the equity is of lower priority than the repayment of other equity investors. The subordinated equity would aim to leverage other equity investors by ensuring that the latter have first claim on the distribution of profit, thereby increasing their risk-adjusted returns. The fund would have claim on profits only after rewards to other equity investors were distributed.
An investment survey conducted by the European Investment Bank in 2021 found that during the COVID-19 pandemic, climate change was addressed by 43% of EU enterprises. Despite the pandemic's effect on businesses, the percentage of firms planning climate-related investment rose to 47%. In 2020, the percentage of climate related investment was at 41%.

62% of Europeans believe that the green transition will reduce their buying power.

Eastern European and Central Asian businesses fall behind their Southern European counterparts in terms of the average quality of their green management practices, notably in terms of specified energy consumption and emissions objectives. External variables, such as consumer pressure and energy taxes, are more relevant than firm-level features, such as size and age, in influencing the quality of green management practices. Firms with less financial limitations and stronger green management practices are more likely to invest in a bigger variety of green initiatives. Energy efficiency investments are good to both the bottom line and the environment.

Europe 
The European Investment Bank plans to support €1 trillion of climate investment by 2030 as part of the European Green Deal. In 2019 the EIB Board of Directors approved new targets for climate action and environmental sustainability to phase out fossil fuel financing. The bank will increase the share of its financing for to climate action and environmental sustainability to 50% by 2025 The European Investment Bank Group announced it will align all financing with the Paris Agreement by the end of 2020. The bank aims "to play a leading role in mobilising the finance needed to achieve the worldwide commitment to keep global warming well below 2˚C, aiming for 1.5˚C."

A survey in 2020 found that 45% of EU companies have invested in climate change mitigation or adaptation measures, compared to 32% in the US. Fewer companies plan future investment in the years following the COVID-19 pandemic. 40% of European companies want to invest in climate initiatives during the next three years. The proportion of investment in 2020 varies from 50% in Western and Northern Europe to 32% in Central and Eastern Europe. The majority of European companies, 75%, say regulatory and tax uncertainty is preventing them from investing in climate-related projects.

According to a 2020 Municipality Survey, 56% of European Union municipalities increased climate investment, while 66% believe their climate investment over the previous three years has been insufficient. In the three years preceding the pandemic, over two-thirds of EU towns boosted infrastructure investments, with a 56% focus on climate change mitigation.

Local municipalities contribute 45% of total government investment. Basic infrastructure, such as public transportation or water utilities, is included in their investment. They also update public facilities including schools, hospitals, and social housing. Prioritizing energy efficiency in these projects will assist Europe in meeting climate targets.

Municipal investment began to increase again about 2017. In the three years preceding the pandemic, over two-thirds of EU towns boosted infrastructure investments. This investment has tended to concentrate on certain types of infrastructure, such as digital infrastructure, at 70% and social services at 60%, as well as climate change mitigation at 56%. Cities and towns are also responsible for around 70% of total greenhouse gas emissions.

Assessing costs and benefits

GDP

The costs of mitigation and adaptation policies can be measured as a percentage of GDP. A problem with this method of assessing costs is that GDP is an imperfect measure of welfare. There are externalities in the economy which mean that some prices might not be truly reflective of their social costs.

Corrections can be made to GDP estimates to allow for these problems, but they are difficult to calculate. In response to this problem, some have suggested using other methods to assess policy. For example, the United Nations Commission for Sustainable Development has developed a system for "Green" GDP accounting and a list of sustainable development indicators.

Baselines

The emissions baseline is, by definition, the emissions that would occur in the absence of policy intervention. Definition of the baseline scenario is critical in the assessment of mitigation costs. This because the baseline determines the potential for emissions reductions, and the costs of implementing emission reduction policies.

There are several concepts used in the literature over baselines, including the "efficient" and "business-as-usual" (BAU) baseline cases. In the efficient baseline, it is assumed that all resources are being employed efficiently. In the BAU case, it is assumed that future development trends follow those of the past, and no changes in policies will take place. The BAU baseline is often associated with high GHG emissions, and may reflect the continuation of current energy-subsidy policies, or other market failures.

Some high emission BAU baselines imply relatively low net mitigation costs per unit of emissions. If the BAU scenario projects a large growth in emissions, total mitigation costs can be relatively high. Conversely, in an efficient baseline, mitigation costs per unit of emissions can be relatively high, but total mitigation costs low.

Ancillary impacts

These are the secondary or side effects of mitigation policies, and including them in studies can result in higher or lower mitigation cost estimates. Reduced mortality and morbidity costs are potentially a major ancillary benefit of mitigation. This benefit is associated with reduced use of fossil fuels, thereby resulting in less air pollution, which might even just by itself be a benefit greater than the cost. There may also be ancillary costs.

Flexibility

Flexibility is the ability to reduce emissions at the lowest cost. The greater the flexibility that governments allow in their regulatory framework to reduce emissions, the lower the potential costs are for achieving emissions reductions (Markandya et al., 2001:455).
"Where" flexibility allows costs to be reduced by allowing emissions to be cut at locations where it is most efficient to do so. For example, the Flexibility Mechanisms of the Kyoto Protocol allow "where" flexibility (Toth et al., 2001:660).
"When" flexibility potentially lowers costs by allowing reductions to be made at a time when it is most efficient to do so.
Including carbon sinks in a policy framework is another source of flexibility. Tree planting and forestry management actions can increase the capacity of sinks. Soils and other types of vegetation are also potential sinks. There is, however, uncertainty over how net emissions are affected by activities in this area.

No regrets options

No regret options are social and economic benefits developed under the assumption of taking action and establishing preventative measures in current times without fully knowing what climate change will look like in the future.

These are emission reduction options which can also make a lot of profit – such as adding solar and wind power.

Different studies make different assumptions about how far the economy is from the production frontier (defined as the maximum outputs attainable with the optimal use of available inputs – natural resources, labour, etc).

The benefits of coal phase out exceed the costs. Switching from cars by improving walking and cycling infrastructure is either free or beneficial to a country's economy as a whole.

Technology

Assumptions about technological development and efficiency in the baseline and mitigation scenarios have a major impact on mitigation costs, in particular in bottom-up studies. The magnitude of potential technological efficiency improvements depends on assumptions about future technological innovation and market penetration rates for these technologies.

Discount rates

Assessing climate change impacts and mitigation policies involves a comparison of economic flows that occur in different points in time. The discount rate is used by economists to compare economic effects occurring at different times. Discounting converts future economic impacts into their present-day value. The discount rate is generally positive because resources invested today can, on average, be transformed into more resources later. If climate change mitigation is viewed as an investment, then the return on investment can be used to decide how much should be spent on mitigation.

Integrated assessment models (IAM) are used to estimate the social cost of carbon.  The discount rate is one of the factors used in these models.  The IAM frequently used is the Dynamic Integrated Climate-Economy (DICE) model developed by William Nordhaus.  The DICE model uses discount rates, uncertainty, and risks to make benefit and cost estimations of climate policies and adapt to the current economic behavior.

The choice of discount rate has a large effect on the result of any climate change cost analysis (Halsnæs et al., 2007:136). Using too high a discount rate will result in too little investment in mitigation, but using too low a rate will result in too much investment in mitigation.  In other words, a high discount rate implies that the present-value of a dollar is worth more than the future-value of a dollar.

Discounting can either be prescriptive or descriptive. The descriptive approach is based on what discount rates are observed in the behaviour of people making every day decisions (the private discount rate) (IPCC, 2007c:813). In the prescriptive approach, a discount rate is chosen based on what is thought to be in the best interests of future generations (the social discount rate).

The descriptive approach can be interpreted as an effort to maximize the economic resources available to future generations, allowing them to decide how to use those resources (Arrow et al., 1996b:133–134). The prescriptive approach can be interpreted as an effort to do as much as is economically justified to reduce the risk of climate change.

The DICE model incorporates a descriptive approach, in which discounting reflects actual economic conditions.  In a recent DICE model, DICE-2013R Model, the social cost of carbon is estimated based on the following alternative scenarios: (1) a baseline scenario, when climate change policies have not changed since 2010, (2) an optimal scenario, when climate change policies are optimal (fully implemented and followed), (3) when the optimal scenario does not exceed 2˚C limit after 1900 data, (4) when the 2˚C limit is an average and not the optimum, (5) when a near-zero (low) discount rate of 0.1% is used (as assumed in the Stern Review), (6) when a near-zero discount rate is also used but with calibrated interest rates, and (7) when a high discount rate of 3.5% is used.

According to Markandya et al. (2001:466), discount rates used in assessing mitigation programmes need to at least partly reflect the opportunity costs of capital. In developed countries, Markandya et al. (2001:466) thought that a discount rate of around 4–6% was probably justified, while in developing countries, a rate of 10–12% was cited. The discount rates used in assessing private projects were found to be higher – with potential rates of between 10% and 25%.

When deciding how to discount future climate change impacts, value judgements are necessary (Arrow et al., 1996b:130). IPCC (2001a:9) found that there was no consensus on the use of long-term discount rates in this area. The prescriptive approach to discounting leads to long-term discount rates of 2–3% in real terms, while the descriptive approach leads to rates of at least 4% after tax – sometimes much higher (Halsnæs et al., 2007:136).

Even today, it is difficult to agree on an appropriate discount rate.  The approach of discounting to be either prescriptive or descriptive stemmed from the views of Nordhaus and Stern.  Nordhaus takes on a descriptive approach which "assumes that investments to slow climate change must compete with investments in other areas".  While Stern takes on a prescriptive approach in which "leads to the conclusion that any positive pure rate of time preference is unethical".

In Nordhaus' view, his descriptive approach translates that the impact of climate change is slow, thus investments in climate change should be on the same level of competition with other investments.  He defines the discount rate to be the rate of return on capital investments.  The DICE model uses the estimated market return on capital as the discount rate, around an average of 4%.  He argues that a higher discount rate will make future damages look small, thus have less effort to reduce emissions today.  A lower discount rate will make future damages look larger, thus put more effort to reduce emissions today.

In Stern's view, the pure rate of time preference is defined as the discount rate in a scenario where present and future generations have equal resources and opportunities. A zero pure rate of time preference in this case would indicate that all generations are treated equally.  The future generation do not have a "voice" on today's current policies, so the present generation are morally responsible to treat the future generation in the same manner.  He suggests for a lower discount rate in which the present generation should invest in the future to reduce the risks of climate change.

Assumptions are made to support estimating high and low discount rates. These estimates depend on future emissions, climate sensitivity relative to increase in greenhouse gas concentrations, and the seriousness of impacts over time. Long-term climate policies will significantly impact future generations and this is called intergenerational discounting.  Factors that make intergenerational discounting complicated include the great uncertainty of economic growth, future generations are affected by today's policies, and private discounting will be affected due to a longer "investment horizon".

Controversy 

Discounting is a relatively controversial issue in both climate change mitigation and environmental economics due to the ethical implications of valuing future generations less than present ones. Non-economists often find it difficult to grapple with the idea that thousands of dollars of future costs and benefits can be valued at less than a cent in the present after discounting. This devaluation can lead to overconsumption and "strategic ignorance" where individuals choose to ignore information that would prevent the overconsumption of resources. Contrary to this, orthodox economists concerned with equality argue that it is important to distribute society's resources equitably across time, and since they generally, rightly or wrongly predict positive economic growth, despite global climate change, they argue that current generations should damage the environment in which future generations live so that the current ones can consume and produce more to equalize the (rightly or wrongly) assumed gains to the future from a supposed growing net GDP. That being said, not all economists share this opinion as notable economist Frank Ramsey once described discounting as "ethically indefensible."

One root of this controversy can be attributed to the discrepancies between the time scales environmentalists and corporations/governments view the world with. Environmental processes such as the carbonate-silicate cycle and Milankovitch cycles occur on timescales of thousands of years while economic processes, such as infrastructure investments, occur on time scales as short as thirty years. The difference between these two scales makes balancing both interests, sustainability and efficiency, incredibly difficult.

Implementation 
Because discounting rates are determined and implemented by individual governments, discounting rates are not unanimous across the globe. They range from percentages as high as 15%, as in the Philippines, to as low as 3%, as in Germany.

United States 
Discounting in the United States is a complicated area for policy analysis. The discounting rate is not the same for every government agency. As of 1992, the recommended discounting rate from the Environmental Protection Agency is 2–3% while the Office of Management and Budget recommends a discount rate of 7%. Further complicating things, these rates are fluid and change every year depending on the administration.

United Kingdom 
The United Kingdom is one of very few governmental bodies that currently use what is known as a declining discount rate. Declining discount rates are gaining popularity due to the fact that they address the uncertainties in economic growth which allows for greater weight to be placed on future benefits, but the extent to this advantage remains to be proven.

Decision analysis

This is a quantitative type of analysis that is used to assess different potential decisions. Examples are cost-benefit and cost-effectiveness analysis. In cost-benefit analysis, both costs and benefits are assessed economically. In cost-effectiveness analysis, the benefit-side of the analysis, e.g., a specified ceiling for the atmospheric concentration of GHGs, is not based on economic assessment.

One of the benefits of decision analysis is that the analysis is reproducible. Weaknesses, however, have been citied:
The decision maker:
In decision analysis, it is assumed that a single decision maker, with well-order preferences, is present throughout the analysis. In a cost-benefit analysis, the preferences of the decision maker are determined by applying the concepts of "willingness to pay" (WTP) and "willingness to accept" (WTA). These concepts are applied in an attempt to determine the aggregate value that society places on different resources.
In reality, there is no single decision maker. Different decision makers have different sets of values and preferences, and for this reason, decision analysis cannot yield a universally preferred solution.
Utility valuation: Many of the outcomes of climate policy decisions are difficult to value.
Arrow et al. (1996a) concluded that while decision analysis had value, it could not identify a globally optimal policy for mitigation. In determining nationally optimal mitigation policies, the problems of decision analysis were viewed as being less important.

Cost-benefit analysis

In an economically efficient mitigation response, the marginal (or incremental) costs of mitigation would be balanced against the marginal benefits of emission reduction. "Marginal" means that the costs and benefits of preventing (abating) the emission of the last unit of CO2-eq are being compared. Units are measured in tonnes of CO2-eq. The marginal benefits are the avoided damages from an additional tonne of carbon (emitted as carbon dioxide) being abated in a given emissions pathway (the social cost of carbon).

A problem with this approach is that the marginal costs and benefits of mitigation are uncertain, particularly with regards to the benefits of mitigation (Munasinghe et al., 1996, p. 159). In the absence of risk aversion, and certainty over the costs and benefits, the optimum level of mitigation would be the point where marginal costs equal marginal benefits. As of 2022 the models are not good enough to be certain, but the IPCC said that "emerging evidence suggests that, even without accounting for co-benefits of mitigation on other sustainable development dimensions, the global benefits of pathways likely to limit warming to 2°C outweigh global mitigation costs over the 21st century" (see economics of global warming#Trade offs).

Damage function

In cost-benefit analysis, the optimal timing of mitigation depends more on the shape of the aggregate damage function than the overall damages of climate change (Fisher et al., 2007:235). If a damage function is used that shows smooth and regular damages, e.g., a cubic function, the results suggest that emission abatement should be postponed. This is because the benefits of early abatement are outweighed by the benefits of investing in other areas that accelerate economic growth. This result can change if the damage function is changed to include the possibility of catastrophic climate change impacts.

Cost estimates

Global costs

Mitigation cost estimates depend critically on the baseline (in this case, a reference scenario that the alternative scenario is compared with), the way costs are modelled, and assumptions about future government policy. Macroeconomic costs in 2030 were estimated for multi-gas mitigation (reducing emissions of carbon dioxide and other GHGs, such as methane) as between a 3% decrease in global GDP to a small increase, relative to baseline. This was for an emissions pathway consistent with atmospheric stabilization of GHGs between 445 and 710 ppm CO2-eq. In 2050, the estimated costs for stabilization between 710 and 445 ppm CO2-eq ranged between a 1% gain to a 5.5% decrease in global GDP, relative to baseline. These cost estimates were supported by a moderate amount of evidence and much agreement in the literature.

Macroeconomic cost estimates were mostly based on models that assumed transparent markets, no transaction costs, and perfect implementation of cost-effective policy measures across all regions throughout the 21st century. Relaxation of some or all these assumptions would lead to an appreciable increase in cost estimates. On the other hand, cost estimates could be reduced by allowing for accelerated technological learning, or the possible use of carbon tax/emission permit revenues to reform national tax systems.

In most of the assessed studies, costs rose for increasingly stringent stabilization targets. In scenarios that had high baseline emissions, mitigation costs were generally higher for comparable stabilization targets. In scenarios with low emissions baselines, mitigation costs were generally lower for comparable stabilization targets.

Distributional effects

Regional costs
Several studies have estimated regional mitigation costs. The conclusions of these studies are as follows:
Regional abatement costs are largely dependent on the assumed stabilization level and baseline scenario. The allocation of emission allowances/permits is also an important factor, but for most countries, is less important than the stabilization level.
Other costs arise from changes in international trade. Fossil fuel-exporting regions are likely to be affected by losses in coal and oil exports compared to baseline, while some regions might experience increased bio-energy (energy derived from biomass) exports.
Allocation schemes based on current emissions (i.e., where the most allowances/permits are given to the largest current polluters, and the fewest allowances are given to smallest current polluters) lead to welfare losses for developing countries, while allocation schemes based on a per capita convergence of emissions (i.e., where per capita emissions are equalized) lead to welfare gains for developing countries.

Sectoral costs

In 2001 it was predicted that the renewables sector could potentially benefit from mitigation. The coal (and possibly the oil) industry was predicted to potentially lose substantial proportions of output relative to a baseline scenario.

Cost sharing

Distributing emissions abatement costs 
There have been different proposals on how to allocate responsibility for cutting emissions:

 Egalitarianism: this system interprets the problem as one where each person has equal rights to a global resource, i.e., polluting the atmosphere.
 Basic needs: this system would have emissions allocated according to basic needs, as defined according to a minimum level of consumption. Consumption above basic needs would require countries to buy more emission rights. From this viewpoint, developing countries would need to be at least as well off under an emissions control regime as they would be outside the regime.
 Proportionality and polluter-pays principle: Proportionality reflects the ancient Aristotelian principle that people should receive in proportion to what they put in, and pay in proportion to the damages they cause. This has a potential relationship with the "polluter-pays principle", which can be interpreted in a number of ways:
 Historical responsibilities: this asserts that allocation of emission rights should be based on patterns of past emissions. Two-thirds of the stock of GHGs in the atmosphere at present is due to the past actions of developed countries.
 Comparable burdens and ability to pay: with this approach, countries would reduce emissions based on comparable burdens and their ability to take on the costs of reduction. Ways to assess burdens include monetary costs per head of population, as well as other, more complex measures, like the UNDP's Human Development Index.
 Willingness to pay: with this approach, countries take on emission reductions based on their ability to pay along with how much they benefit from reducing their emissions.

Specific proposals 

 Equal per capita entitlements: this is the most widely cited method of distributing abatement costs, and is derived from egalitarianism. This approach can be divided into two categories. In the first category, emissions are allocated according to national population. In the second category, emissions are allocated in a way that attempts to account for historical (cumulative) emissions.
 Status quo: with this approach, historical emissions are ignored, and current emission levels are taken as a status quo right to emit. An analogy for this approach can be made with fisheries, which is a common, limited resource. The analogy would be with the atmosphere, which can be viewed as an exhaustible natural resource. In international law, one state recognized the long-established use of another state's use of the fisheries resource. It was also recognized by the state that part of the other state's economy was dependent on that resource.

Barriers to change 
It may not be in the interest of many large companies to help mitigate climate change sufficiently instead of striving to generate near-maximum profit in the contemporary socioeconomic system, a globalized competitive consumption-demanding environment, and use all legal means to delay climate change action if such is beneficial. This is because their products are being bought by consumers, the stock market likely underestimates (or cannot value) e.g. social benefits of climate mitigation, they are regulatable by governments, and don't have as much power as many large states (or groups of such) which e.g. have capacities of law enforcement and military, customs, legal frameworks and for business-, media-, education-, global-, trade- and industrial policies. 

A fraction of such policies or measures are invariably initially at least partly unpopular, and in the contemporary decision-making environment of (campaign-marketing-, party-, media-, and electoral/referendum plain votes-based) politics, unpopular decisions may be difficult for politicians to enact directly or help facilitate indirectly. The question of the largest responsibility or driver may be about who is holding (or withholding) the power (and capacity) to create and change the systems that cause climate change, such as the transportation system.

According to a study, "staying within a 1.5 °C carbon budget (50% probability) implies leaving almost 40% of 'developed reserves' of fossil fuels unextracted". Climate policies-induced future lost financial profits from global stranded fossil-fuel assets would lead to major losses for freely managed wealth of investors in advanced economies in current economics.

See also

Carbon fee and dividend
Circular economy
Eco-innovation
Eco-investing
Ecological design
Ecological economics
Eco-Tariffs
Ecotax
EU climate pact
Green economy
Green growth
Green infrastructure
Green urbanism
Low-carbon economy
Nature-based solutions
One Earth Climate Model
Sustainable city
Sustainable development
Sustainable urbanism
Zero-carbon city

References

Sources 

 .
. PBL publication number 500253004. JRC Technical Note number JRC65918.

External links
IPCC Working Group III (WG III). This body assesses options for mitigating climate change through limiting or preventing greenhouse gas emissions and enhancing activities that remove them from the atmosphere.

Climate change policy
Economics and climate change
Climate change mitigation